Oddmund Andersen (21 December 1915 – 23 November 1999) was a Norwegian football defender who played as a centre-half and was a reserve member of the Norway squad in the 1938 FIFA World Cup. In total, he won four full caps for Norway between 1936 and 1946. His older brother Hans Andersen was also capped once by Norway.

On club level, Andersen played for Mjøndalen. He was a member of the MIF teams that won the Norwegian Cup in 1934 and 1937.

References

External links
FIFA profile

1915 births
1999 deaths
Norwegian footballers
Norway international footballers
Association football defenders
Mjøndalen IF players
1938 FIFA World Cup players